William Blundell Spence (13 January 1814 – 23 January 1900) was an English painter and art dealer.

Born in Drypool, Yorkshire, to noted entomologist William Spence and his wife Elizabeth Blundell, he spent the years 1826-1832 travelling abroad with his parents. In 1836 he settled in Florence, Italy, where he spent the rest of his life.

As a painter, he specialized, mainly painting Alpine landscapes. At the 1870 Exhibition of Fine Arts in Parma, he exhibited an oil: Bagni of Lucca. Among other works are Dallo Porte Sante and La pensierosa. At Florence, in 1882: Veduta della Marina. In 1885, in the same city: Veduta del Chalet Plauta.

Though not himself an entomologist, he joined the Entomological Society of London at its founding in 1833, and was noted as its longest-surviving original member.

References

19th-century English painters
English male painters
English art dealers
1814 births
1900 deaths
19th-century English businesspeople
19th-century English male artists
English expatriates in Italy